Michael Haley may refer to:

 Michael Haley (rugby league) (born 1987), English rugby league footballer
 Mike Haley (rugby union) (born 1994), Irish rugby union footballer
 Michael Haley (soldier), officer in the South Carolina National Guard and husband of South Carolina Governor Nikki Haley

See also
 Micheal Haley (born 1986), Canadian ice hockey forward
 Michael Healey, Canadian playwright and actor